The Iwo Jima-class amphibious assault ships of the United States Navy were the first amphibious assault ships designed and built as dedicated helicopter carriers, capable of operating up to 20 helicopters to carry up to 1,800 marines ashore. They were named for battles featuring the United States Marine Corps, starting with the Battle of Iwo Jima. The first ship of the class was commissioned in 1961, and the last was decommissioned in 2002. The hull classification of "LPH" stands for "Landing Platform Helicopter".

Operational history

Ships of this class participated in several conflicts and peacekeeping and humanitarian relief operations:
Nuclear weapons test support, Johnston Atoll 1962
Cuban Missile Crisis 1962
Vietnam War 1963-1973
Dominican Civil War 1965
Gemini and Apollo spacecraft recovery 1966-1975
Iran hostage crisis 1980
Multinational Force in Lebanon, 1982-1983
Operation Urgent Fury, Grenada, 1983
Operation Earnest Will, Persian Gulf 1987-1988
Operation Sharp Edge, Liberia, 1990
Gulf War 1990-1991
Operation Eastern Exit, Somalia, 1991
Operation Restore Hope, Somalia, 1993
Operation Continue Hope, Somalia, 1994
Operation Deny Flight, Bosnia, 1994
Operation Uphold Democracy, Haiti, 1994
Operation Vigilant Warrior, Kuwait, 1994
Operation Assured Response, Liberia, 1996

One ship of this class, was used in a 1970-1974 Sea Control Ship experiment to test the concept of a smaller aircraft carrier using V/STOL aircraft.

Another ship, was converted to a mine countermeasures ship which hosted mine sweeping helicopters.

The hull design of the Iwo Jima-class also became the basis of the slightly larger  of amphibious command ships.

Ships in class

Popular culture

One of the Iwo Jima-class ships served as the fieldsite in Edwin Hutchins's classic cognitive science study Cognition in the Wild. Although Hutchins does not mention the ship class by name, on p. 7 he characterizes it as a  amphibious helicopter carrier.

References

 hazegray.org: Iwo Jima-class amphibious assault ships

Amphibious warfare vessel classes
Helicopter carrier classes
 Iwo Jima class amphibious assault ship
 Iwo Jima class amphibious assault ship
 Iwo Jima class amphibious assault ship